Pairique Chico  is a village in Jujuy Province, Argentina, in the Susques Department.

Seismicity
The seismicity of the area of Jujuy is frequent and low intensity, and mean to severe seismic silence every 40 years.

 1863 earthquake: This earthquake on January 4, 1863, measuring 6.4 on the Richter scale, indicated an important milestone in the history of seismic events in Jujuy. It highlighted the need to impose stricter construction codes.
 1948 earthquake: The August 25, 1848, measuring 7.0 on the Richter scale, destroyed buildings and opened numerous cracks in wide areas.
 2009 earthquake: November 6, 2009, measuring 5.6 on the Richter scale.

References 

Populated places in Jujuy Province